The Sunshine Coast Rugby Union is the local rugby union competition on Australia's Sunshine Coast. Through Sunshine Coast Rugby Union Limited it serves as the governing body for rugby on the Sunshine Coast.

History

The Sunshine Coast and District Rugby Union was established in 1982, the first time an organised rugby union competition existed on the Coast since 1919. Various junior competitions have been established since including a club competition and a schools comp.

The following clubs contested the 1982 season

Maroochydore Swans
Nambour Toads
Caloundra Lighthouses
Gympie Hammers
Maroochydore and Noosa were the only two clubs to win the Sunshine Coast A-grade rugby union premiership from 1982 through 2006. University were the team to break this run — winning in 2007, 2008, and 2009. Noosa reclaimed the premiership in 2010, before University, Caboolture and Maroochydore won the next three respectively. Noosa claimed the title back in the 2014 season. In 2015 the grand final home ground advantage was awarded to USC for their win against Noosa in the A grade Major semi. The 2015 grand finals were contested by USC and Noosa in A grade and Caloundra and Noosa in reserve grade at University of the Sunshine Coast. USC and Caloundra were crowned champions.

Amalgamation of regional bodies
In response to the Queensland Rugby Union's efforts, four separate organizations amalgamated to form the Sunshine Coast Rugby Union Ltd in 2009. The four organizations were the Sunshine Coast and District Rugby Union, the Sunshine Coast and District Junior Rugby Union, Sunshine Coast Rugby Union Referees Association and Sunshine Coast Rugby Union Schools Association.

2020 – present

Eumundi and Maleny
2020 saw Eumundi enter its first adult side since the 1919 North Coast season. Their entry into reserve grade brought that grade to 10 teams. However, Maleny would withdraw its reserve grade side citing various reasons.

Effect of COVID-19
The 2020 season initially got underway on March 15. Two days latter the season was suspended.

Under the draw in place at the start of the season, the Women's season was scheduled to kick off April 18 the A grade and Colts Under 19's seasons were scheduled to kick off on April 25. Reserve grade kicked off as scheduled on March 15 two days before the season was suspended.

The season restarted on August 1. A grade, the women's 12 a side, and Colts Under 19's are all due to be a double round robin while 

Reserve grade is due to be single round robin.

Season 2021 started as planned. Eumundi withdrew its only side after a few rounds.

Due to a lockdown imposed on all bar one of the local government area with an SCRU team – Gympie – the season was suspended with one home and away round to play.

Competitions

The Sunshine Coast Rugby Union senior club competitions include:
 A grade
 Reserve grade
 Colts (not contested between 2013 and 2017)
 Women's 10s

Clubs

Clubs that compete in the senior competitions, as of 2020, are:
 Brothers
 Caboolture Snakes
 Caloundra Lighthouses
 Eumundi Dragons
 Gympie Hammers
 Maroochydore Swans
 Nambour Toads
 Noosa Dolphins
 University of Sunshine Coast Barbarians
 Wynnum

Representative teams 

The SCRU selects representative teams each year which compete under the name "Stingrays". The senior men's Sunshine Coast Stingrays teams played in the Queensland Premier Rugby competition from 2005 to 2013 but after facing funding difficulties in the lead up to the 2014 season are now focused on the Queensland Country Championships. The women's Stingrays compete in rugby sevens tournaments such as the Nambour Sevens and the Ballymore Sevens.

See also

Rugby union in Queensland

Notes

References

External links
 
 

 
Sport in the Sunshine Coast, Queensland
Rugby union governing bodies in Queensland
Rugby union competitions in Queensland
Sports organizations established in 1982
1982 establishments in Australia